Clark P. Johnson (born July 21, 1952) is an American politician and former member of the Minnesota House of Representatives. A member of the Minnesota Democratic–Farmer–Labor Party (DFL), he represented District 19A in south-central Minnesota.

Early life and education
Johnson was born in Fargo, North Dakota. He attended Michigan State University, graduating in 1974 with a B.A. in social science. He later attended Minnesota State University, Mankato, graduating in 1985 with a B.S. in social studies education and again in 1990, graduating with a M.S.

Minnesota House of Representatives
Johnson was first elected to the Minnesota House of Representatives in a special election in 2013.

Personal life
Johnson is married to his wife, April Moen. They have two daughters and reside in North Mankato, Minnesota. He is a faculty member at Minnesota State University, Mankato.

References

External links

1952 births
Living people
Politicians from Fargo, North Dakota
People from North Mankato, Minnesota
Michigan State University alumni
Minnesota State University, Mankato alumni
Minnesota State University, Mankato faculty
Democratic Party members of the Minnesota House of Representatives
21st-century American politicians